Atrix may refer to:

Atrix (game), a South Korea online action game
Motorola Atrix 4G, a smartphone made by Motorola
The Atrix (band), an Irish new wave/powerpop band